Charles O'Malley, Irish fur trader and urban founder, .

O'Malley was a native of County Mayo. He became a fur trader in Michigan, where he was "responsible for bringing a substancial number of Irish immigrants there in 1834." In 1843, O'Malley proposed Irish names for some Michigan counties, including Antrim, Clare, Emmet, Roscommon and Wexford counties.

O'Malley became a member of the Michigan state legislature in 1846, being re-elected in 1847 and 1849. In 1849 he was chosen Speaker pro tempore.

References

 O'Malley:People and Places, Ballinakella Press, 1986.

People from County Mayo
19th-century Irish people
Irish emigrants to the United States (before 1923)
Speakers of the Michigan House of Representatives
Members of the Michigan House of Representatives
19th-century American politicians